is a Japanese singer and actor. He is a former member of the group AAA.

Career

Following Urata's arrest in April 2019, he announced he was leaving AAA on December 31, 2019.

Controversy
On April 19, 2019, Urata was arrested for allegedly assaulting a 20-year-old woman after she rejected his offer to buy her a drink. Urata later claimed that he was drunk at the time and did not remember the incident.

Discography

Studio albums

Cover albums

Compilation albums

Singles

Filmography

TV series

Movie

Radio

References

External links 
 
 Official blog
 Naoya Urata on Twitter

1982 births
Living people
Male actors from Tokyo
Singers from Tokyo
AAA (band) members
21st-century Japanese singers
21st-century Japanese male singers